Memorials to victims of the KGB have been set up in several countries that were formerly occupied by the Soviet Union, often in former KGB prisons,  to document the repressions of the Soviet secret police and to commemorate its victims. Some are in the form of monuments at the location of KGB prisons or execution sites, others are museums and documentation centres.

Estonia
The KGB Cells Museum in Tartu is situated in the "gray house", which in the 1940s and 1950s housed the South Estonian Centre of the NKVD/KGB. The basement floor with the cells for prisoners is open for visitors. Part of the cells, lock-ups and the corridor in the basement have been restored.

Lithuania
The Museum of Genocide Victims was set up in Vilnius on 14 October 1992 in the former KGB headquarters (which had been used by the Gestapo during the Nazi occupation). The building also houses the Lithuanian Special Archive, where documents of the former KGB archive are kept.

Latvia
"The Black Door", a memorial at the former KGB building on Stabu Street in Rīga, was unveiled in 2003. The memorial, designed by artist Glebs Pantelejevs, is a half-open steel door and a commemorative plaque.

Germany
A memorial and exhibition centre is being created in the former KGB prison in Potsdam. Initially used for interrogating alleged Western spies, some of whom were executed, the prison later mainly held Soviet soldiers who had been arrested for mutiny, desertion, or anti-Soviet activity.

See also
KGB
Rehabilitation (Soviet)
Human rights in the Soviet Union
Soviet political system
Soviet law

References

Political repression in the Soviet Union
NKVD
KGB
Memorials to victims of communism